The NSW TrainLink D sets, also referred to as the Mariyung trains, are a class of electric multiple units (EMU) being built to replace NSW TrainLink's Intercity EMU fleet. Mariyung is a Dharug word for emu, a flightless bird native to Australia. The trains will operate on services from Sydney to Newcastle, Lithgow and Kiama, allowing the retirement of NSW TrainLink's V set fleet, and freeing the H set fleet for reallocation to Sydney suburban services.

The first trains were delivered in December 2019. After a protracted dispute between the government and the driver's trade union over their safety, the first are scheduled to enter service in the first quarter of 2023.

History 
In May 2014, the Government of New South Wales announced its intention to purchase new carriages for the NSW TrainLink Intercity network. The new trains will replace the V sets and allow the H sets to be cascaded to Sydney Trains services.

In August 2014, expressions of interest from manufacturers were called for. The following parties responded:
Alstom
Bombardier Transportation
CAF
Downer Rail / CNR Changchun
Hyundai Rotem
Stadler Rail
UGL Rail / Mitsubishi Electric / CSR Corporation

In July 2015, the government announced that Alstom, Downer/Changchun, Stadler, and UGL/Mitsubishi Electric/CSR had been shortlisted to tender. Following the merger of CSR and the parent company of Changchun Railway Vehicles, Hyundai Rotem replaced CSR as a partner in the UGL/Mitsubishi Electric consortium. The consortia provided two variants of their designs - a longer train and shorter train. The Hyundai Rotem/UGL/Mitsubishi Electric consortium was announced as the successful bidder in August 2016. The companies formed a joint venture called RailConnect to manage the project. The trains are being built by Hyundai Rotem's Changwon factory in South Korea.

The initial contract covered the supply and maintenance of the 512 carriages which would consist of 77 4-car trains and 34 6-car trains, as well as the construction of the Kangy Angy Maintenance Centre. which was completed in August 2020. The maintenance contract runs for fifteen years from the delivery of the first train with an option for a five-year extension. In February 2019, a further 42 carriages were ordered to extend 21 of the 77 4-car trains into 6-car trains to allow for more 10-car train operations especially on the South Coast line during peak hour.

A contract was let to Downer EDI to make modifications and upgrades to existing rail infrastructure across the electrified network to accommodate the new fleet. Platform extensions at multiple stations were also required to accommodate 10-car trains.

The first two 10-carriage trains were delivered in December 2019 and testing started the following month.

During early ordering stages, the trains were simply referred to as the New Intercity Fleet. In April 2021, the name Mariyung, a Darug word for emu, was officially designated for the fleet.

In July 2021, the Mariyung fleet received its final approval to carry passengers from the independent Office of the National Rail Safety Regulator and would enter service as soon as possible. At the time, 16 trains were being tested on the network and 8 of which were ready to progressively enter passenger service.

In September 2021, 56 additional carriages were ordered, bringing the total number of carriages to 610, meaning that there would be 61 of both the 4 car and 6 car variants.

Background

Proportions 
In 2015 the project reached a $1.1B blowout due to modifications that were required for the design of the train, changing proportions from almost identical to the V sets to the standard suburban double decker proportions. This was criticised by Shadow Transport Minister Ryan Park as "a very expensive mistake".

This required works to provide additional clearance on several sections of the Blue Mountains line between Springwood, Katoomba, and Lithgow, including the heritage-listed Ten Tunnels Deviation. The new trains would also be too long for the platforms at Linden and Warrimoo stations. Labor MP Trish Doyle accused the Baird government of jumping "head-first into a project without actually running the measuring tape over the narrowest point the trains have to pass through", going on to say that "Instead of buying 'off-the-shelf' designs, they should have brought the project in-house to the experts at Railcorp and designed a new train with our local conditions in mind from the outset, The Minister [Andrew Constance] hasn't done his homework, and after boasting about getting a cheap deal on new trains, we now discover that the trains won't actually fit down the line. You couldn't make this stuff up."

Work started on clearing the line in 2017, with Labor MP Jodi McKay saying the amount of work needed to make the line capable of handling the new trains was "astonishing."

Union opposition and safety concerns 
In 2018 Gladys Berejiklian announced that the trains would have a maximum of two staff members on board, suggesting that the train guard be either replaced by a customer service role or merged with a customer service role, ruling out Driver Only Operation. Rail Tram and Bus Union (RTBU) state secretary Alex Claassens welcomed any announcement regarding safety and retaining train guards.

However, in 2019 it was announced that Driver Only Operation would be implemented, with the driver viewing the side of the train via several CCTV cameras. The RTBU criticised this move as being "unsafe", due to the lack of microphones on the train.

In February 2020 the RTBU announced that members would refuse to staff the New Intercity Fleet over safety and employment concerns.

On 27 November 2020 a snap strike in protest of the safety concerns was performed by the RTBU, shutting down all intercity services effective immediately until 7am.

A confidential 2018 report to the NSW government revealed that the doors could easily fail when opened at speed, which was only announced to the public in 2021. Gladys Berejiklian knew of these issues as of 2020.

On 5 February 2021 an incident where a commuter fell between a train and the platform at Hornsby station in January was highlighted as a potentially fatal situation if it had occurred with a D set.

On 2 March 2021 the RTBU claimed "WE WON" after the Customer Service Guard position was cancelled.

In November 2021 an 18-month delay of entry into service was announced due to the union standoff and the COVID-19 pandemic, with Labor transport spokesperson Jo Haylen saying it was "yet another transport procurement debacle” from the government.

Over December 2021 the RTBU carried out a series of industrial actions as follows:
 1/12/2021 – Station staff and shunters wearing shorts indefinitely
 6/12/2021 – Drivers sounding horns at all stations during daylight hours
 7/12/2021 – Ban on operating Public-Private Partnership (PPP) rolling stock (M sets, H sets, A sets, B sets and D sets)
 8/12/2021 to 13/12/2021 – Ban on cleaning hazardous waste and graffiti
 14/12/2021 – Ban on operating PPP rolling stock
 15/12/2021 – 24 hour ban on issuing fines
 17/12/2021 – Work to rule indefinitely
 20/12/2021 – Full overnight stoppage network wide
 21/12/2021 to 23/12/2021 – Ban on performing work where contractors are present

On 22 March 2022 Nine News revealed the RTBU regarding the CCTV cameras as unsafe, highlighting the lack of microphones, viewing blackspots, and poor vision quality, especially in the rain.

Approval by the Office of the National Safety Regulator 
In July 2021, the independent Office of the National Rail Safety Regulator deemed the fleet to be safe, endorsing the Government's position on the matter. Sue McCarrey, CEO of the ONRSR, outlined that they had worked with the operator since design stage right through to testing, pledging that ongoing safety audits would continue through to their operation. Additionally, McCarrey concluded that there was no greater risk than the current older fleet and in fact the use of technology on the new fleet would make them even safer; "We believe that risk is being managed through the technology on the train. The operating model we have approved for the NIF includes the use of a driver, a guard and the use of CCTV cameras at each door providing both the guard and the driver a view down the entire platform. Both the driver and the guard have access to screens to show them what is actually happening along the entire platform". McCarrey made it clear that as an independent regulator she is not part of the current negotiations between the RTBU and the train operator (NSW Trains) and nor should she be, however if those negotiations resulted in a change to the operating model, then the ONRSR would have to relitigate those proposed changes and once again complete that independent check to ensure that the changes proposed to the train operations continue to effectively manage the risks.

Network disruptions 
The NSW government directly shut down the entire passenger rail network in response to the RTBU's protected industrial action on 21 February 2022, with no replacement bus services occurring and zero prior notice. Overcrowding onto buses was widespread at locations such as Chatswood and Parramatta. The RTBU started a protest against the shutdown at Central Grand Concourse, with the RTBU saying "This is not a strike, we are not on strike".

Premier Dominic Perrottet stated that it was a "coordinated attack by the Labor party and the union movement". Former Prime Minister Scott Morrison stated that the unions "put on a strike at 2 am this morning, throwing Sydneysiders into complete chaos".

Documents showed that the NSW Government was planning on a two-week-long shutdown.

Fair Work Commission 
On 18 February 2022, Sydney Trains and Transport for NSW lodged an application to the Fair Work Commission seeking to suspend or terminate any further industrial action from the RTBU regarding the D sets, the Transport Asset Holding Entity, wages and any other cause. After the February shutdown the Fair Work action was suspended.

Maintenance 
In September 2017 the Central Coast Express Advocate opposed the Kangy Angy Maintenance Centre citing issues of noise and flooding.

In December 2021 it was announced that only 20 out of 300 jobs would be made from the Kangy Angy Maintenance Centre, which was heavily criticised by several Labor MPs including Chris Minns.

Design 
They will include accessible toilets and dedicated space for luggage, prams, bicycles and wheelchairs. Fixed seats on the upper and lower decks will be in a two by two arrangement. The seating will include cup holders, tray tables and arm rests. Each seat will feature a charging station for mobile devices. The trains are being designed to be operated with or without guards, with tender documents stating the trains must support one-man operation.

The new trains are wider than the V sets they replace and required modifications to be made to parts of the Blue Mountains line route to create sufficient clearance from adjacent structures. A contract was awarded to the Continuum Alliance, an alliance between Transport for NSW, CPB Contractors and Lendlease, to make these modifications. Work started in February 2019 and was completed in July 2020. They are scheduled to enter service in the first quarter of 2023.

Services 
The trains are expected to operate on the following services:
Blue Mountains: Central to Lithgow
Central Coast & Newcastle: Central to Newcastle
South Coast: Bondi Junction / Central to Port Kembla & Kiama

References

External links 
D set data sheet

Double-decker EMUs
Electric multiple units of New South Wales
Hyundai Rotem multiple units
NSW TrainLink

1500 V DC multiple units of New South Wales